The surname Lanman may refer to:

 Charles Lanman (1819–1895), librarian and explorer
 Charles Rockwell Lanman (1850–1941), Harvard University professor, scholar of Sanskrit and editor of the Harvard Oriental Series
 Fritz Lanman (1981–present), American entrepreneur and investor
 James Lanman (1767–1841), American lawyer and United States Senator
 James Lanman (musician) American singer-songwriter
 Dr. Richard B. Lanman (1955–present), American physician-scientist and historical ecologist
 Colonel William K. Lanman Jr. (1904–2001), aviator and benefactor of Yale University